James MacLurcan (born 15 March 1985) is an Australian actor, director, and model.

He is probably best known for portraying Mackenzie 'Mack' Hartford, the Red Ranger, on Power Rangers: Operation Overdrive. His modeling work includes appearances in the Australian Vogue.

Career
He hosted the making of Power Rangers: Operation Overdrive titled Power Rangers Operation Overdrive: Behind the Scenes, a behind the scenes look on the show's makeup, props, sets, and wardrobe.

He was invited as a guest to the Power Morphicon in June 2007.

James has also worked as a comedy writer for The Ronnie Johns Half Hour and is part of the comedy group The Nice Guys.

As James McFay
Under his alias James McFay, he directed and acted in Tiger (2009) a one-hour film about two models who fall in love during a winter session in Japan. He also directed Burning Hearts (2011) a short film about a taxi driver who fights the Yakuza in order to save the life of a teenage girl in Tokyo.

Filmography

Films

Television

References

External links
 

1985 births
Living people
Australian male television actors
Australian male film actors
Australian comedy writers
Australian television writers
Australian screenwriters
People educated at St Aloysius' College (Sydney)
Australian male models
Models from Sydney
Australian film directors
Australian male television writers